The Calcasieu Parish Public Library serves citizens in all of Calcasieu Parish. This system has thirteen locations and is governed by a nine-member board. The largest location is the Central Library, located in Lake Charles, Louisiana, and the library system is a member of the Libraries Southwest consortia.

History 
The Calcasieu Parish Public Library began in 1944. On April 4, 1973, the Calcasieu Parish Police Jury passed Ordinance #1442 consolidating the Calcasieu Parish Public Library and the Lake Charles Public Library, which was established in 1901. The consolidation went into effect on January 1, 1974. On August 1, 1973, the Calcasieu Parish Police Jury entered into a joint services agreement with the City of Lake Charles. This agreement gave the mayor of Lake Charles the power to nominate five members of the Library Board of Control. The other four seats of this board are named by the President of the Police Jury. All nine members are confirmed by the Police Jury. Two ex officio members are the Police Jury President, or their representative, and the Mayor of Lake Charles.

Branches 
The Calcasieu Parish Public Library has 13 locations, including the main location, Central Library. This also includes Express Libraries opened at three branch locations that were closed due to heavy damage from Hurricane Laura and Hurricane Delta in 2020. The Express Libraries were made possible by a $20,000 grant from the American Library Association.

 Carnegie Memorial Library - 411 Pujo Street, Lake Charles, LA 70601
 Central Library - 301 W. Claude Street, South Lake Charles, LA 70605
 DeQuincy Library - 102 W. Harrison St., DeQuincy, LA 70633
 Epps Express Library - 1320 N. Simmons St., North Lake Charles, LA 70601
 Hayes Library - 7709 Perier St., Hayes, LA 70646
 Iowa Library - 107 East 1st St., Iowa, LA 70647
 Maplewood Outreach Center - 91 Center Circle, Suphur, LA 70663
 Moss Bluff Express Library - 261 Parish Road, Lake Charles, LA 70611
 Starks Library - 113 S. Highway 109, Starks, LA 70661
 Sulphur Regional Library - 1160 Cypress St., Sulphur, LA 70663
 Southwest Louisiana Genealogical & Historical Library - 411 Pujo St., Downtown Lake Charles, LA 70601
 Vinton Express Library - 1601 Loree St., Vinton, LA 70668
 Westlake Library - 937 Mulberry St., Westlake, LA 70669

Other Services 
In 2013 the Calcasieu Parish Public Library launched a free home delivery service known as “Library-to-Go.” This service is intended to serve home bound library patrons such as those at nursing homes, group homes, and daycare centers. For additional information, visit this webpage - https://calcasieulibrary.libnet.info/library-to-go-6026

Awards 
In 2010 the Calcasieu Parish Public Library received the Highsmith Library Innovation Award that year for a Summer Reading Program Yard Sign project. Yard signs were used to encourage students to read during the summer.

References

Education in Calcasieu Parish, Louisiana
Organizations established in 1901
Public libraries in Louisiana
Lake Charles, Louisiana